Rha is a hamlet in the municipality of Bronckhorst, Gelderland, the Netherlands.

Its population is about 75 and Rha and nearby Olburgen celebrated their 1000-year existence in 1996. Windmill De Hoop is located in Rha as well as the Bronckhorster Brewing Company.

Gallery

References

External links
The official site of the municipality of Bronckhorst

Populated places in Gelderland
Bronckhorst